Vestal is a town within Broome County in the Southern Tier of New York, United States, and lies between the Susquehanna River and the Pennsylvania border. As of the 2020 census, the population was 29,110.

Vestal is on the southern border of the county and is west and southwest of Binghamton.

Vestal is home to Binghamton University which draws visitors to the town through its entertainment and sporting events. The university adds thousands of students to the town and employs more than 3,000 faculty and staff.

History 
The first European settlers arrived in Vestal around 1785.

The central area of Vestal, near Route 26 at Choconut Creek, was the site of an indigenous village of the Ochugnut tribe of the Tuscarora people. During the American Revolution, a squad of soldiers from the Sixth Massachusetts Regiment, under the command of Lt. William McKendry were sent to engage the tribes, when possible, and destroy their homes and crops. During the summer of 1779, the squad did burn at least two villages without encountering resistance, including one situated in what is now nearby downtown Binghamton (the Chenango, at the confluence of the Chenango and Susquehanna rivers), and the Ochugnut (Choconut) at the site of Choconut Creek near present-day Vestal High School.

This campaign during the American Revolution was initiated following Indigenous predations against settlers, presumed to have been carried out by tribes forming part of the Iroqouis alliance. This hostile activity against settlers was encouraged by the British. However, some evidence indicates that at least some of the indigenous people were actually Tuscarora—descendants of the Cherokee who fled from North Carolina after wars in 1711 and the War of 1763. This community was actually sympathetic to the American cause, siding against the rest of the Iroquois confederation. See Sullivan Expedition or external links for more information on the role of Upstate New York in this conflict.

Following the war, several European families settled in the area near the town of Union. The town of Vestal was formed from the southern half of Union in 1823.

In 1901, on June 8, Vestal was the location of a huge explosion of dynamite aboard a train of the Delaware, Lackawanna and Western Railroad.  A second train crashed into that train from behind while it was taking on water.  The trains were destroyed and twelve trainmen were killed and injured. So many curiosity seekers came to view the scene that extra trains had to be run to bring them to it.

The history of the town is closely related to its neighbors, Binghamton, Endicott, and Johnson City. During the 20th century, Vestal served as a residential suburb to emerging industries in its area, such as Endicott Johnson Corporation, IBM, and Lockheed Martin.

In 1955, Harpur College began to plan its current location in Vestal. This move was complete by 1961. The  site was purchased from Hazard Lewis Farms, a local dairy, anticipating future growth for the school. Founded as "Triple Cities College of Syracuse University" in Endicott, the college has become Binghamton University, the highest ranked public university in the Northeastern United States. The university adds 14,000 students to the local population each school year, and draws large numbers into the town for sporting, arts and other events.

The Kopernik Observatory & Science Center is a public observatory in Vestal opened to the public on 16 June 1974 by the Kopernik Society of Broome County to commemorate the 500th anniversary of the birth of the astronomer Nicolaus Copernicus in 1973. It is one of the best-sited and best equipped public observatories in the Northeast United States.

During the 1990s, Vestal became the major retail center of the Southern Tier region of New York, with many large shopping centers such as the Town Square Mall, Parkway Plaza, Shoppes at Vestal, and Campus Plaza being built along the Vestal Parkway (NY Route 434), which became one of the busiest roads in the area. Vestal's historic central business district is located along three blocks of Front Street, still lined with small shops.

The Drovers Inn and Round Family Residence and Vestal Central School were listed on the National Register of Historic Places in 2010.

Geography

The town of Vestal is on the south side of the Susquehanna River. The Susquehanna River flows westward past Vestal to towns like Owego and Waverly in Tioga County. From there, the river bends southward into Pennsylvania through Wilkes-Barre and Harrisburg, eventually flowing into the Chesapeake Bay at Havre de Grace, Maryland.

The northern town line is defined by the Susquehanna River, the western town boundary is the border of Tioga County, and the southern town line is the border of Susquehanna County, Pennsylvania.

New York State Route 17 passes across the northern part of the town and intersects north–south highway New York State Route 26 by the Susquehanna River. New York State Route 434, Vestal Parkway, intersects NY-26 south of the NY-17 junction. New York State Route 201 also crosses to the north shore of the Susquehanna River, linking the eastern part of Vestal with the village of Johnson City.

Demographics

As of the Census of 2000, there were 26,535 people, 8,525 households, and 5,924 families residing in the town. In the 2010 census, the number becomes 28,043. The racial makeup of the town was 87.13% White, 2.19% African American, 0.15% Native American, 8.33% Asian, 0.99% from other races, and 1.20% from two or more races. Hispanic or Latino of any race were 2.40% of the population.

There were 8,525 households, out of which 29.6% had children under the age of 18 living with them, 59.9% were married couples living together, 7.0% had a female householder with no husband present, and 30.5% were non-families. Of all households 25.1% were made up of individuals, and 10.7% had someone living alone who was 65 years of age or older.  The average household size was 2.45 and the average family size was 2.95.

In the town, the population was spread out, with 18.9% under the age of 18, 24.0% from 18 to 24, 20.6% from 25 to 44, 20.8% from 45 to 64, and 15.8% who were 65 years of age or older.  The median age was 34 years. For every 100 females, there were 90.6 males.  For every 100 females age 18 and over, there were 86.7 males.

The median income for a household in the town was $51,098, and the median income for a family was $60,676. Males had a median income of $48,731 versus $29,035 for females. The per capita income for the town was $22,363.  About 4.3% of families and 7.1% of the population were below the poverty line, including 7.6% of those under age 18 and 5.1% of those age 65 or over.

Transportation

Vestal is linked from the west primarily by New York State Route 17, which is under development to become Interstate 86. NY 17 leads east  to Interstate 81 and Interstate 88 in Binghamton. Two major bridges over the Susquehanna River (New York State Route 26 and New York State Route 201) and one minor bridge (Bridge Road) link Vestal to the villages of Endicott and Johnson City. New York State Route 434, the "Vestal Parkway", is the main artery through Vestal. It provides a direct link to Binghamton in the east.

Broome County Transit provides Vestal with bus service around the town and to surrounding municipalities. Private flights can also be flown out of the Greater Binghamton Airport. 

Vestal had been a stop, midway between Binghamton and Owego, on the Delaware, Lackawanna and Western's mainline, serving passenger trains such as the Phoebe Snow.

Educational institutions
 Binghamton University, a SUNY university center with over 17,000 students
 Vestal Central School District, a school district which includes Vestal High School and Vestal Middle School
 Hillel Academy
 Ross Corners Christian Academy

Shopping, dining and entertainment
Campus Plaza
Parkway Plaza
Parkway Row
The Shoppes at Vestal
Town Square Mall
University Plaza

Recreational areas
The town of Vestal has 21 town-operated and -maintained parks which cater to all ages.

 Arnold Park – Andrews Road
 Four picnic shelters (shelter #1 is under construction), tables, grills, playground equipment, playing fields with lights, football field, softball fields, rest room facilities, running water, electricity, nature trail, hiking, sand volleyball court, ice skating, fitness trail, cross country skiing, parking.
 African Road Park – African Road
 Picnic shelter, grill, playground equipment, running water, stream, playground, electric, parking.
 Barlow Park – Main Street
 Picnic shelter, tables, grill, playground equipment, running water, parking, electricity.
 Castle Gardens Park – Garden Lane
 Picnic shelter, tables, grill, playground equipment, ball field, half basketball court, running water, no parking.
 David Avenue Park – David Avenue
 Picnic shelter, tables, grill, playground equipment, tennis court, basketball court, stream.
 DEC Flood Fields – Main Street
 Soccer fields, ball field, golf practice.
 Ethel Place Park – Ethel Park
 Picnic shelter, tables, grill, playground equipment, basketball and kickball court, running water, no parking.
 Fuller Hollow Park – Marietta Drive
 Picnic shelter, tables, playground equipment, ball field, stream, no parking.
 Harold Moore Park – Old Vestal Road
 Picnic shelter, tables, grill, playground equipment, softball fields, two full court basketball courts, rest rooms and concession stand, running water, soccer fields, electricity, river access, boat ramp, parking.
 Jones Park – State Line Road
 Nature trail, stream, hiking, biking, cross country skiing, parking. Dogs allowed on leash.
 Memorial Park – Four Corners—Rt. 434 & Front Street
 Band Gazebo, electricity, park benches, and free summer band concerts on Tuesdays at 7:00 PM. No parking.
 Middendorf Park – Juneberry Road
 Picnic shelter, tables, grill, playground equipment, ball field, basketball court, running water, parking.
 Richards Avenue Park – Richards Avenue
 Picnic shelter, tables, grill, playground equipment, no parking, running water.
 Ross Corners Park – Old Owego Road
 Picnic shelter, tables, grill, playground equipment, tennis courts, ball field, soccer field, running water, parking, ice skating.
 Stair Park – Murray Hill Road
 Picnic shelter, tables, playground equipment, running water, parking, electric.
 Stratford Park – Stratford Drive
 Picnic shelter, tables, playground, running water, no parking.
 Twin Orchards – Myrtle Street
 Picnic shelter, tables, playground, ball field, running water, soccer field and parking. Accessible from the Vestal Rail Trail.
 Vestal Center Park – Coleman Street
 Picnic shelter, playground equipment, tennis courts, baseball field, basketball court, running water, ice-skating, parking.
 Vestal Memorial Pool – Clayton Avenue
 Large outdoor pool & wading pool, rest rooms & changing area, electricity, running water, parking.
 Willow Point Park – Gates Road
 Three softball fields.
 Vestal Rail Trail
It runs between North Main Street and African Road and is located just north of and parallel to the Vestal Parkway (Rt. 434). The trail has a twelve-foot paved path and eight feet of grass on either side of the trail. Available for walking, skating, running, and cycling. Parking at Stage Rd. and on the east side of the Shoppes at Vestal. Restrooms are available at the African Road (east) end of the trail. The trail has benches, a gazebo, a scenic overlook and nature trail,  dog waste facilities, and is next to the Twin Orchards—Myrtle Street park.

The largest park in the area is Arnold Park located off Pierce Hill Road. This park offers a newly constructed plastic playground, picnic areas, a sand volleyball court, a standard sized baseball field and three other large grassy areas, as well as a nature trail through the wooded areas surrounding the park. In October, the Recreation Department holds a Halloween event at the park. In August, the Recreation Department hosts a picnic and summer festival. The Recreational Baseball League hosts at this park a variety of competitions amongst leagues.

The Recreation Department operates the 40×20 yard Vestal Memorial Pool located on Clayton Avenue off Route 434.

Hamlets
The Town of Vestal recognizes five hamlets within its borders:

 Ross Corners is named for David Ross, a prominent lumberman who owned a store during much of the 19th century in the west of the town.
 Tracy Creek is named for Benjamin Tracy and is situated by a creek of the same name. It was originally a lumbering and farming community. It is also located in the western section of the town.
 Twin Orchards is a hamlet on the south bank of the Susquehanna River, named for the large orchards that used to border both sides of its main road.
It was originally spelled in English fashion ("Vestal Centre"), but this was changed in 1893. President Theodore Roosevelt once visited and gave a speech.
 Willow Point is located east of Twin Orchards, also on the south bank of the Susquehanna River.

Other locations
 Castle Gardens: On the shore of the Susquehanna River in the western section of the town.
 Four Corners: The town's center; refers to the intersection of Main Street and the Vestal Parkway (previously called Five Corners before Front Street was rerouted away from the intersection in 1967).
 South Vestal: A hamlet in the southern part of the town on Route 26. 
 Stair Tract: Two developments (Upper and Lower) on the eastern edge of the town.
 Vestal Hills: A hamlet in the northeastern part of town, adjacent to Binghamton.

In popular culture
 The town of Vestal is mentioned in the song "Skeleton Appreciation Day in Vestal, NY (Bones)" by Will Wood and the Tapeworms.

References

External links
 Town of Vestal official website
 Early history of Vestal, NY
 Susquehanna River Level at Vestal, NY
 Vestal Recreation Department pictures

Binghamton metropolitan area
Towns in Broome County, New York